Studio 86 is a 1986 Australian TV anthology series. It starred Gia Carides, Zoe Carides and Steve Bisley.

References

External links
Studio 86 at IMDb

Australian Broadcasting Corporation original programming
Australian drama television series
Australian anthology television series
1986 Australian television series debuts